Maharashtra Kesari ( in Sanskrit) is an Indian-style wrestling championship, established in 1854 in Maharashtra, India. It is organized by the Maharashtra Kustigir Parishad.

Prize 
Cash prize was awarded to the winner since the start. In addition, Government of Maharashtra also provided honorary sum amount to the title holders above age 50. Until 2012, to be eligible for this amount, the title holder's annual income had to be less than.

The winners are also eligible to apply for government jobs under sports quota.

Records 
Sardar Bhomji Panchariya won the first championship in 1854. Narsing Yadav holds the record of winning the title three times consecutively from 2011 to 2013 and in 2016 Vijay chaudhary tied the record of Narsing Yadav. Vijay also won three times consecutively from 2014 to 2016, whereas Ganpat Khedkar, Chamba Mutnaal, Laxman Wadar, Dadu Chougule and Chandrahar Patil have won the title twice. After winning his second title in 2008, Chandrahar Patil also competed in the 2009 championship whereas previous double title holders had not competed the third time. Yuvaraj Patil hold the record of being the youngest winner at the age of 17.

Maharashtra Kesari 1961- present
Maharashtra State Kustigir Parishad, established by Wrestling Maharshi Mamasaheb Mohol, has been organizing the highest level 'Maharashtra Kesari' wrestling competition in the state for the last six-seven decades. The aim of this competition is to make wrestling evolve, to make good wrestlers out of the region and help them shine at the country and world level. Maharashtra Kesari is being held in the clay and matt divisions. In this, the winner wrestler from the clay division open category and the winner wrestler from the mattress division open category will fight the final on Matt as per international standards, and the winner of this final fight is declared as 'Maharashtra Kesari' and the honorary mace of Maharashtra Kesari is awarded.

Winners

Key

Other Title holders from Maharashtra

Hind Kesari

Rustam-e-Hind

Olympics

Khashaba Jadhav - Bronze 🥉
Bantamweight
1952 Summer Olympics

National Awards

Arjuna Award

Dhyanchand Award

Notes 
Hiraman Bankar is father of Vijay Bankar. Dadu Chaugule is father of vinod Chaughule.

References

External links

Wrestling competitions in India
Sport in Maharashtra
Recurring sporting events established in 1961
|}